Zimbabwe regained its independence from the United Kingdom on 17 April 1980. Canaan Banana, a Methodist minister and theologian, became the first President of Zimbabwe on 18 April.

On 17 February 1982 the government of Zimbabwe accused Joshua Nkomo, leader and founder of the Zimbabwe African People's Union (ZAPU), of plotting a coup d'état, and dismissed him from the cabinet.

The Gukurahundi (also known as the "Matabeleland genocide") began in 1983. More than 300,000 youths signed up for service in the Youth Brigade.

Prime Minister Robert Mugabe (ZANU) and Joshua Nkomo (ZAPU) signed a Unity Accord on 22 December 1987, giving the ZAPU leader a place in the government, freeing dissidents, and bringing a formal end to violence of the Gukurahundi. Mugabe became the new President of Zimbabwe after reforming the constitution on 31 December 1987, abolishing the position of Prime Minister.

Morgan Tsvangirai was elected Secretary General of the Zimbabwe Congress of Trade Unions in 1988.

The Zimbabwe African People's Union (ZAPU) merged with the Zimbabwe African National Union (ZANU) under the name Zimbabwe African National Union – Patriotic Front (ZANU-PF) on 19 December 1989.